Vickram Outar Bharrat (born in Guyana) is a Guyanese politician.

Career
Bharrat worked as the owner of Xenon Academy, fifteen years he has been an educator, mentor and entrepreneur.
He is a current Minister of Natural Resources in Guyana. Bharrat was sworn into President Irfaan Ali's cabinet on August 5, 2020, by Irfaan Ali.

Education
Vickram Bharrat is qualified in the area of Public Management and has a Bachelor’s Degree in Computer Science from the University of Guyana, he has vast experience in governance and managerial competency.

References

Living people
Government ministers of Guyana
People's Progressive Party (Guyana) politicians
Year of birth missing (living people)
Guyanese people of Indian descent